Vinton Township may refer to one of the following places in the United States:

 Vinton Township, Valley County, Nebraska, one of fifteen townships in Valley County, Nebraska, United States
 Vinton Township, Vinton County, Ohio, one of the twelve townships of Vinton County, Ohio, United States

See also

Vinton (disambiguation)

Township name disambiguation pages